The Kachelotplate is a sandbar in the North Sea. It lies near the German coast, west of the island of Juist. Since 2003, enough stays above high tide that it can be called an island. Grass and dunes are settling there.

The new island is 2.5 kilometres long and up to 1.3 kilometres wide.

East Frisian Islands
Uninhabited islands of Germany
Landforms of Lower Saxony
Landforms of Germany
Sandbanks of the North Sea